Saint Clair Township is one of twenty townships in Benton County, Iowa, USA.  As of the 2000 census, its population was 461.

Geography
According to the United States Census Bureau, Saint Clair Township covers an area of 35.82 square miles (92.78 square kilometers).

Adjacent townships
 Eldorado Township (north)
 Fremont Township (northeast)
 Florence Township (east)
 Lenox Township, Iowa County (southeast)
 Washington Township, Iowa County (south)
 Marengo Township, Iowa County (southwest)
 Leroy Township (west)
 Union Township (northwest)

School districts
 Benton Community School District

Political districts
 Iowa's 1st congressional district
 State House District 75
 State Senate District 38

References
 United States Census Bureau 2007 TIGER/Line Shapefiles
 United States Board on Geographic Names (GNIS)
 United States National Atlas

External links

 
US-Counties.com
City-Data.com

Townships in Benton County, Iowa
Cedar Rapids, Iowa metropolitan area
Townships in Iowa